MYX is the only music channel in the Philippines that shows different music videos, domestically and internationally. Every week, its MYX Hit Chart presents the Top 20 favorite music videos voted by People's choice. In 2014, Taylor Swift's "Shake It Off" spent the longest week for any music video with a total of 10 weeks and later became the chart's year-end special Top 1. The year is also lucky for Western boy bands such as One Direction, 5 Seconds of Summer and The Vamps as their released music videos were all chart-toppers. Philippine acts including Sarah Geronimo, Gloc-9, Kyla, and more also dominated the chart with most weeks.

Chart History

See also
Myx Music Awards 2014

References

External links

2014 in the Philippines